Andoh is a surname. Notable people with the surname include:

Adjoa Andoh (born 1963), British actress
Ama Pomaa Andoh, Ghanaian politician
Brite Andoh (born 1999), Ghanaian footballer
Chief Kweku Andoh (1836–1898), British colonial army officer
Dominic Kodwo Andoh (1929–2013), Ghanaian Roman Catholic archbishop
Doreen Andoh, Ghanaian radio personality
Enoch Andoh (born 1993), Ghanaian footballer
Frank Andoh (born 1986), Ghanaian footballer